Wilfred E. Anthony (1878–1948) was an American architect. A "Gothic specialist", he worked for Cram, Goodhue & Ferguson.

He designed several buildings, including the Church of Sweden in Midtown Manhattan, New York City.

Notable works 
 Church of Sweden in New York, New York City (1921)
 Basilica of the Sacred Heart, Notre Dame, Indiana (1931)
 Corpus Christi Church, New York City (1935)
 Church of St. Vincent Ferrer, Holy Name Society Building, New York City
 Dominican Priory, River Forest, Illinois
 Fenwick High School, Oak Park, Illinois
 Valentino-Cidat showroom, New York City

See also
Alfred E. Reinhardt

References

1878 births
1948 deaths
19th-century American architects
20th-century American architects
Gothic Revival architects